Limnocharis flava (commonly known as yellow velvetleaf, sawah flower rush, sawah lettuce) is a species of aquatic flowering plant which is native to Mexico, Central America, South America, Cuba, Haiti and the Dominican Republic but widely naturalized in southern and southeastern Asia: India, Sri Lanka, Cambodia, Burma, Thailand, Vietnam, Indonesia, Malaysia, Brunei and southern China (Guangdong, Yunnan).

Its triangular-shaped leaves and hollow stems are glabrous. Its inflorescences have a very characteristic shape, producing three-lobed yellow flowers about 1.5 cm in diameter. The fruits are spherical. Although it is not a floating plant, its seeds are carried away by currents.

Yellow velvetleaf grows generally wherever there is not very deep stagnant fresh water, in swampy areas. It sometimes invades rice fields where it can become a weed. As an invasive species it has become a pest in some wetlands in other parts of the world.

As food
Traditionally this plant is an important vegetable in parts of Indonesia, the Philippines, Vietnam, Laos, Isan (Thailand) and parts of India, where the central flower stalk and the leaves are used in soups, curries, salads and stir-fries. The immature flower buds are also eaten. In Isan the leaf is eaten raw with nam phrik. Owing to its flat taste, in some areas it is considered "poor people's food" or emergency food, eaten whenever there is not much else left. This characteristic was put into song by Muhammad Arief, in the 1940s hit Genjer-genjer in the Banyuwangi language in Java.

See also 
 List of plants with edible leaves
 Thai cuisine
Lao cuisine
Indonesian cuisine
 Javanese cuisine
 List of Thai ingredients
List of freshwater aquarium plant species

References

External links

Vegetables, spices and fruits of Thailand
FAO - Aquatic plants for human food
Thai biodiversity - Limnocharis flava

Alismataceae
Asian vegetables
Freshwater plants
Edible plants
Javanese cuisine
Isan cuisine
Lao cuisine
Vietnamese cuisine
Flora of Mexico
Flora of South America
Plants described in 1868
Taxa named by Aimé Bonpland
Taxa named by Alexander von Humboldt